Gymnammodytes cicerelus, also known as Mediterranean sand eel, sonso in Catalan, and  barrinaire or enfú in Menorca, is a fish in the family Ammodytidae. It is the only species of this family in the Mediterranean Sea. It is a species from the family Ammodytidae, the sandlances or sandeels.

It is found over sandy or gravelly substrates in the east-central Atlantic from Portugal to Senegal, including the Canary Islands and the Cape Verde Islands, and into the Mediterranean Sea and eastwards into the Black Sea.

Its maximum size is 17 cm. It is highly appreciated as food in certain areas of Italy, as well as in Catalan cuisine where it is fried after being lightly coated in batter.

Gallery

References

 Rafinesque, C. S. Caratteri di alcuni nuovi generi e nuove specie di animali e piante della sicilia, con varie osservazioni sopra i medisimi. 1810. (Part 1 involves fishes, pp. [i-iv] 3-69 [70 blank], Part 2 with slightly different title, pp. ia-iva + 71-105 [106 blank]). Caratteri. Pls. 1-20.

External links

 AQUATAB.NET

Ammodytidae
Taxa named by Constantine Samuel Rafinesque
Fish described in 1810